Golsinda corallina is a species of beetle in the family Cerambycidae. It was described by Francis Polkinghorne Pascoe in 1857. It is known from Laos, Borneo and Sumatra.

References

Mesosini
Beetles described in 1857